Baptiste Mischler (born 23 November 1997) is a French middle-distance runner. He won the silver medal in the 1500 metres at the 2015 European Junior Championships.

International competitions

Personal bests

Outdoor
800 metres – 1:47.17 (Mannheim 2016)
1000 metres – 2:18.23 (Monaco 2018)
1500 metres – 3:37.17 (Paris 2018)

References

External links 
 

1997 births
Living people
French male middle-distance runners
People from Haguenau
Athletes (track and field) at the 2014 Summer Youth Olympics
Athletes (track and field) at the 2020 Summer Olympics
Olympic athletes of France
Sportspeople from Bas-Rhin
20th-century French people
21st-century French people